Bukta Tromsø Open Air Festival, commonly abbreviated The Bukta Festival, is an open-air music festival taking place every July in Telegrafbukta, Tromsø, Norway. The festival was first staged in 2004.

History 
The festival was first staged in 2004, but its history can be traced back a further two years. In 2002 and 2003 the North of Nowhere festival was arranged in a field near Åsgård, Tromsø. This festival was staffed completely by volunteers, grounded in an ideal of a non-alcoholic, gratis and free for all ages arrangement.
In November 2003 North of Nowhere was given the "Rock Festival of the Year" award after a contest held by polling from other Norwegian festivals (festivals belonging to the umbrella organization Norwegian Rock Association). The very same day the idea of a larger festival first saw the light of day, and prior to the Christmas 2003, North of Nowhere was history and Bukta Tromsø Open Air Festival was founded.

At the very first Bukta Festival in 2004 roughly 5,000 attendees got to see Norwegian acts such as Sondre Lerche, Madrugada, Span and BigBang at what was considered the greatest festival success in Tromsø in more than a decade.

2005 dawned with a higher level of ambition, with international acts such as Phoenix (FR), Supersuckers (US) and The Soundtrack of Our Lives (SE) grazing the festival stage. Along with higher profile artists, attendance soared to 11,000 visitors. The very same year, Bukta Tromsø Open Air Festival picked up the gauntlet from North of Nowhere, and was awarded the "Festival of the Year" award.

2006 saw further progression, and the festival was completely sold out a fortnight before the first concert. Some 13,000 attendees got to see among others Motörhead (UK), Danko Jones (CAN), Håkan Hellstrøm (SE), Mew (DK), Kaizers Orchestra, DumDum Boys and Seigmen.

For 2007, the festival was expanded from two to three days, something which enabled the festival directors to book even more acts and further expand the artistic palette of the festival. Many of the attendees will probably remember 2007 as the year Iggy & The Stooges visited Tromsø.

In 2008 the festival added an additional stage, and a total of 28 bands played for a record crowd. With The festival being sold out all three days, more than 20,000 people got to see amongst others Patti Smith (US), Wovenhand (US), Leningrad Cowboys (FI), Kent (SE) and Raga Rockers.

The festival area has a daily capacity of 6000 people, and consists of three stages.

The Festival Organization 
Bukta – Tromsø Open Air Festival is a non-profit foundation, with the annual general meeting as the highest authority. The annual general meeting elects the festival board, consisting of a chairperson and four board members. The board is working within the guidelines set by the annual general meeting. The daily administration of the festival consists of three employees – with the festival manager and the producer/marketing director being employed full-time, and a PR officer employed part-time.

The Festival manager at the Bukta Festival is Lasse Lauritz Pettersen.

Producing the festival 
Carrying out the Bukta Festival would be impossible without volunteer workers. During the festival in 2008 more than 400 volunteer workers were involved in the festival.

In 2005 The Bukta Festival launched a cooperation with Kafé X of Tromsø. The Kafé X is an organization run by people with former drug problems, offering a variety of cultural and other activities. This cooperation has increased gradually over the last few years, and during the Bukta Festivalen of 2008 more than 50 volunteers from the café made an invaluable contribution.

In addition to the main event of the festival, there has been arranged a free concert with no age limit every Saturday morning. This concert is non-alcoholic and has a "family friendly profile".

Since its inception in 2004 Superfamily, Magnet, Turboneger, Madrugada and HGH have played at the morning concert, in addition to local acts such as Fingerprince, Desert Highway, Vishnu and Turdus Musicus.

Artists that have performed at Bukta

Artists 2004

Artists 2005

Artists 2006

Artists 2007

Artists 2008

Artists 2009

Artists 2010

Artists 2011

Artists 2012

Artists 2013

Artists 2014

Artists 2015

Artists 2016

Artists 2017

Artists 2018

References

External links 
 Festival web site (English)
 Pictures from previous festivals

Music in Tromsø
Rock festivals in Norway
Recurring events established in 2004